Paul Smith (4 October 1920, Dublin, Ireland – 11 January 1997, Dublin) was an Irish writer and playwright.

Biography
Smith was born near Charlemont Street in Dublin, the son of a wheelwright.  He became involved with the Gate Theatre at 16 years of age. In Ireland he worked as a costume maker and designer in the Abbey Theatre and Gate Theatre, both in Dublin. He went to London in the 50s and then on to Sweden, where he started writing. He then moved to America and soon after to Australia, where he settled in Melbourne for some years.  While there he wrote The Countrywoman (1962), The Stubborn Season (1962), and 'Stravanga (1963).  He returned to Dublin in 1972 where he remained until he died on 11 January 1997.

He was awarded the American Irish Foundation Literary Award in 1978, and was a member of Aosdána, an Irish association of artists.

Works
Esther's Altar (NY: Abelard-Schuman 1959), later reprinted as Come Trailing Blood (London: Quartet Books 1977)
The Stubborn Season (London: Heinemann 1961)
The Countrywoman (London: Heinemann 1962)
’Stravanga (London: Heinemann 1963)
Summer Sang in Me
Esther's Altar, performed in Los Angeles (1978)

References

Irish male dramatists and playwrights
People from Portobello, Dublin
1920 births
1997 deaths
20th-century Irish novelists
20th-century Irish male writers
20th-century Irish dramatists and playwrights
Irish male novelists